This is a list of aircraft shootdowns, dogfights and other incidents during wars since World War II. An aircraft shootdown occurs when an aircraft is struck by a projectile launched or fired from another aircraft or from the ground (see anti-aircraft warfare) which causes the targeted aircraft to lose its ability to continue flying, and subsequently crash, often resulting in the death of the occupants on board. This list does not cover aircraft destroyed during the Korean War, the Vietnam War, or Operation Desert Storm.

Military aircraft

Cold War (1945–1992)
  (2) 9 February 1948 – Two Turkish Supermarine Spitfire were shot down by Bulgarian small arms fire.
  27 October 1948 – An Italian Lockheed P-38 Lightning was shot down by Yugoslavia.
  22 January 1949 – A USAF North American T-6 Texan was shot down by Communist guerrillas over Greece killing the pilot.
  8 April 1950 – A US Navy PB4Y-2 Privateer of VP-26 which had departed from Wiesbaden, West Germany was shot down during a patrol mission over the Baltic by four Soviet Air Force La-11 "Fangs" off of Liepāja, Latvia.
  4 September 1950 – A US Navy F4U-4B Corsair from the carrier USS Valley Forge shot down a Soviet Naval Aviation Douglas A-20 over the Yellow Sea, southeast of Port Arthur Naval Base. 
Catalina affair (June 1952)
Air battle over Merklín (10 March 1953)
Avro Lincoln shootdown incident (12 March 1953)
  27 January 1954 – An engagement over the Yellow Sea between eight Chinese PLAAF MiG-15 "Fagots" and a flight of USAF F-86 Sabres escorting an RB-45 Tornado ends in the downing of one of the attacking MiG-15 by first lieutenant Bertram Beecroft.
  (2) 26 July 1954 – Off Hainan island two PLAAF La-11 "Fangs" attack two USN AD-4 Skyraiders from VF-54 launched off the USS Philippine Sea (CV 47) while they are searching for survivors of the Cathay Pacific DC-4 shot down by the PLAAF four days earlier. Under attack, pilots William Alexander and John Zarious were soon aided by more AD-4 Skyraiders of their own squadron as well as one F4U-5N of VC-3. One Lavochkin was downed by two AD-4 piloted by Roy Tatham and Richard Cooks, the other by F4U pilot Edgar Salsig and AD-4 pilots John Damien, John Rochford, Paul Wahlstrom and Richard Ribble.
  (2) 5 February 1955 – 60 km west of Pyongyang over the Yellow Sea an RB-45 Tornado of the 91st Strategic reconnaissance squadron escorted by eight USAF F-86 Sabres found themselves under attack by twelve KPAF MiG-15 "Fagots", the engagement resulted in the downing of two of the attacking Mikoyan by Sabre pilots Charles Salmon and George Williams.
  17 April 1955 – A USAF RB-47E Stratojet of the 4th Strategic Reconnaissance Squadron took off from Eielson AFB and was later shot down off Kamchatka by two Soviet MiG-15 "Fagots" flown by Korotkov and Sazhinwith. All crew of Lacie C. Neighbors, Robert N. Brooks and Richard E. Watkins Jr are reported missing presumed dead.
 / (2) 10 May 1955 – Over the Yellow Sea eighty kilometers southwest of Sinuiju a group of eight USAF F-86 Sabres finds itself under attack by twelve PLAAF MiG-15 "Fagots", pilot Xizhong Ni claims the downing of one Sabre. USAF pilots Robert Fulton and Burt Phythyon each claim to have downed a MiG themselves.
  18 August 1955 – After accidentally flying above the Korean Demilitarized Zone, a USAF LT-6 Texan Trainer was downed by North Korean ground fire killing the pilot and observer on board.
  10 April 1959 – 1959 Canberra shootdown
  1 May 1960 – U-2 shootdown incident
  26 August 1960 – An Indian Air Force Dakota DC-3 registered HJ233 trying to drop relief materials and ammunitions to a besieged post was shot down by the Naga Army. All on board were captured alive and were later released unharmed.
  (2) 16 August 1962 – two Turkish Air Force F-84F Thunderstreaks shot down two Iraqi Air Force Il-28 "Beagle" bombers that crossed the Turkish border by mistake during a bombing operation against Iraqi Kurdish insurgents.
  27 October 1962 – in the morning, a U-2F (the third CIA U-2A, modified for air-to-air refueling) piloted by USAF Major Rudolf Anderson, departed its forward operating location at McCoy AFB, Florida. At approximately 12:00 pm EDT, the aircraft was struck by a S-75 Dvina (NATO designation SA-2 Guideline) surface-to-air missile launched from Cuba. The aircraft was shot down, and Anderson was killed.
  28 January 1964 – 1964 T-39 shootdown incident
  15 April 1969 – 1969 EC-121 shootdown incident
 / 28 November 1973 – Soviet MiG-21 pilot Captain Gennadii N. Eliseev killed after ramming an IIAF RF-4C intruding into Soviet airspace on behalf of CIA Project Dark Gene, USAF Colonel John Saunders was in the rear seat. Both ejected and were captured by Soviet authorities.
  (2) 21 June 1978 – 1978 Iranian Chinook shootdown
  14 September 1983 – a pair of Turkish Air Force F-100F Super Sabre fighter jets of 182 Filo "Atmaca" penetrated Iraqi airspace. A Mirage F-1EQ of the Iraqi Air Force intercepted the flight and fired a Super 530F-1 missile at them. One of the Turkish fighter jets (s/n 56-3903) was shot down and crashed in Zakho valley near the Turkish-Iraqi border. The plane's pilots reportedly survived the crash and were returned to Turkey. The incident was not made public by either side, although some details surfaced in later years. The incident was revealed in 2012 by Turkish Defence Minister İsmet Yılmaz, in response to a parliamentary question by Republican People's Party (CHP) MP Metin Lütfi Baydar in the aftermath of the downing of a Turkish F-4 Phantom II in Syria, in 2012.
  25 May 1982 – 1982 Royal Air Force Jaguar shootdown incident
  (2) In 1988, Soviet MiG-23MLDs using R-23s downed two Iranian AH-1J Cobras that had intruded into Afghan airspace.
  21 October 1989 – a Turkish land registry BN-2 Islander photographic mapping plane was shot down by a Syrian Air Force MiG-21bis, piloted by Hussam Mezien. All four on board died in the crash.

Internal conflict in Myanmar (1948–present) 
  11 January 2013 – A Mil Mi-35P either crashed or was shot down by Kachin Independence Army rebels killing three.
  3 May 2021 – a Myanmar Air Force Mi-35 was shot down by the Kachin Independence Army, hit by a MANPADS during air raids involving attack helicopters and fighter jets. A video emerged showing the helicopter being hit while flying over a village.

Taiwan Straits Conflicts (1950–1967) 
  14 March 1950 – A RoCAF North American B-25 Mitchell was shot down PLAAF aircraft killing six.
  16 March 1950 – A RoCAF North American P-51 Mustang was shot down PLA ground fire killing pilot.
  2 April 1950 – A RoCAF North American P-51 Mustang was shot down by Soviet aircraft near Shanghai killing the pilot.
  29 July 1950 – Anti-aircraft fire from Xiamen shoots down a RoCAF P-47N Thunderbolt killing its pilot.
  16 June 1953 – Anti-aircraft fire from Dongshan Island shoots down a RoCAF P-47N Thunderbolt killing its pilot.
  17 December 1953 – Anti-aircraft fire in Jejiang shoots down a RoCAF P-47N Thunderbolt killing its pilot.
  22 May 1954 – in an engagement involving six PLAAF MiG-15 "Fagots", RoCAF pilots Chien and Yen shoot down one of the MiGs with machinegun fire from their P-47N Thunderbolts.
  26 May 1954 – Anti-aircraft fire from Fujian downs an RoCAF B-17 Flying Fortress with all of its four crewmen killed.
  3 June 1954 – A La-11 "Fang" of the PLAAF downs an RoCAF P-47N Thunderbolt killing its pilot.
  6 July 1954 – Cannonfire of a MiG-15 "Fagot" of the PLAAF downs an RoCAF P-47N Thunderbolt killing its pilot.
  12 September 1954 – Anti-aircraft fire from Xiamen downs an RoCAF PB4Y Privateer killing all nine crew.
  19 January 1955 – Anti-aircraft fire downs an RoCAF F-84G Thunderjet over the PRC killing its pilot.
  21 January 1955 – Anti-aircraft fire downs an RoCAF P-47N Thunderbolt over the PRC killing its pilot.
  9 February 1955 – During the evacuation of nationalist Chinese from the Tachen islands covered by aircraft launched from USS Wasp (CV-18), a USN AD-5W Skyraider on antisubmarine patrol from VC-11 is heavily damaged by PRC Anti-aircraft fire and forced to ditch at sea. its crew of three are rescued by patrol boats of the ROC.
  22 June 1955 – A MiG-17 "Fresco" of the PLAAF shoots down an RT-33A of the RoCAF killing its pilot.
  4 July 1955 – A MiG-15 "Fagot" among a group of four PLAAF Mikoyan is shot down in combat with four F-84G Thunderjets of the RoCAF.
  16 July 1955 – Anti-aircraft fire from Kinmen downs an RoCAF F-84G Thunderjet killing its pilot.
  15 October 1955 – A PLAAF MiG-15 "Fagot" is shot down by Tzu-Wan Sun of the RoCAF in his F-86 Sabre.
  14 April 1956 – A MiG-15 "Fagot" among a group of four PLAAF Mikoyan is shot down in combat with four F-84G Thunderjets of the RoCAF.
  22 June 1956 – A RoCAF B-17 Flying Fortress is shot down during a nighttime mission by cannonfire from an intercepting MiG-17 "Fresco" of the PLAAF. All eleven crew on board perish.
  20 July 1956 – A MiG-15 "Fagot" among a group of four PLAAF Mikoyan is shot down in combat with four F-84G Thunderjets of the RoCAF.
  (2) 21 July 1956 – Two MiG-17 "Frescos" among a group of three PLAAF Mikoyan are shot down by pilot I-Fang Ouyang flying among four RoCAF F-84G Thunderjet.
  10 November 1956 – During an airdrop over Jejigxi a C-46 Commando of the RoCAF is shot down by a PLAAF MiG-19 "Farmer" killing its nine crewmen.
  1 July 1957 – Anti-aircraft fire downs an RoCAF P-47N Thunderbolt over the PRC killing its pilot.
  18 February 1958 – A MiG-15 "Fagot" of the People's Liberation Army Naval Air Force brings down a RoCAF RB-57D above Shandong killing the pilot.
  (2) 29 July 1958 – Four MiG-17 "Frescos" engaged four F-84G Thunderjets patrolling near Nan Ao Island resulting in the downing of two Thunderjets by pilots Gao ChangJi and Zhang YiLing of the PLAAF 54th Regiment
  (3) 14 August 1958 – Three PLAAF MiG-17 "Frescos" are shot down by a group of four RoCAF F-86 Sabres, With pilots Ping-Chun Chin and Chung-Li Li each shooting down one themselves. A third Mikoyan being brought down by two other Sabres flown by Hsien-Wu Liu and Fu-The Pan. afterwards Sabre No. 307 involved in the shootdown failed to return to base.
  (2) 25 August 1958 – Two PLAAF MiG-17 "Frescos" are engaged and shot down by RoCAF F-86 Sabres piloted by Tien-En Chiang and Hsu-Hsiang Ku
 / (7) 8 September 1958 – Seven PLAAF MiG-17 "Frescos" are shot down by numerous F-86 Sabres of the RoCAF. Five pilots, Ping-Chun Chin, Yi-Chien Li, Chin-Chung Liang, Chung-Tsi Yu and Wai-Ming Chu each being credited one kill, Hsien-Wu Liu downs two more himself. On the PLAAF side pilot Zhang Yi destroys one F-86 Sabre in his MiG-17 "Fresco"
 / (6) 18 September 1958 – Above Haicheng Guangdong Six PLAAF MiG-17 "Frescos" are shot down by a number of RoCAF F-86 Sabres flown by Wan-Li Lin, Yang-Chung Lu, Che-Shing Mao, Tzu-Wan Sun, Kuang-Hsing Tung and Hsin-Yeh Liu with each downing one Mikoyan. One Sabre is brought down by cannon fire from a PLAAF MiG-17 "Fresco" piloted by Chang Zhu You.
  (11) 24 September 1958 – Shortly after their aircraft had been retrofitted by technicians of the United States Marine Corps to carry the AIM-9B Sidewinder air to air missiles, Numerous missile armed RoCAF F-86 Sabres took off and gave chase to a group of PLAAF MiG-17 "Frescos" that had cruised above them. Due to the superior rate of climb, vertical maneuverability, thrust to weight ratio and service ceiling the Fresco pilots did not perceive any danger in doing this as they were unaware of this newly installed armament. Sabre pilots began to fire their missiles at the MiG's destroying some. Others broke into a dive and entered a horizontal turning engagement with their pursuers who held an advantage in horizontal turn-rate allowing them to engage with guns shooting down more of the PRC jets. Pilots Jing-Chuen Chen, Chun-Hsein Fu, Jie-Tsu Hsia, Shu-Yuen Li, Ta-Peng Ma and Hong-Yan Sung shot down one MiG-17 each, Yi-Chiang Chien shot down two himself and two pairs of pilots Tasi-Chuen Liu with Tang Jie-Min and Hsin-Yung Wang with Yuen-Po Wang shared in the downing of one MiG by each duo. During this engagement one further Fresco sustained notable damage being impacted by an AIM-9 that did not detonate. It escaped with an intact missile within the airframe that was extracted after returning to its base and hesitantly transferred to the Soviet Union for reverse engineering.
  2 October 1958 – Anti-aircraft fire from Kinmen knocks down a C-46 Commando killing all five crewmen.
 / (4) 10 October 1958 – Over the PRC four RoCAF F-86F Sabre Pilots engage and shoot down four MiG-17 "Frescos" of the PLAAF, As one of the Fresco burn it explodes launching chunks of debris towards and striking one of its attackers causing heavy damage, An RoCAF pilot ejects and is captured and placed in detention until his release on 30 June 1959.
  29 May 1959 – Above Guandong a PLAAF MiG-17 "Fresco" intercepts and shoots down a RoCAF B-17 Flying Fortress killing all 14 on board.
  (2) 5 July 1959 – Above the Taiwan Straits twenty four PLAAF MiG-17 "Frescos" are engaged by four F-86 Sabres of the RoCAF ending in the destruction of two Frescos.
  7 October 1959 – Above Beijing an RoCAF RB-57D piloted by Wang Ying Chin is the first plane to ever be shot down by a surface to air missile. Chin dies after his plane was destroyed by an SA-2 Guideline missile.
  6 November 1961 – Above Shantung province an RB-69A Neptune is destroyed by an SA-2 Guideline missile killing all 13 aboard.
  9 September 1962 – Fifteen Kilometers south of Nunchang an RoCAF Lockheed U-2A is shot down by an SA-2 Guideline missile. Pilot Chen Huai Sheng bails out and is captured after landing but dies some time later in a PRC hospital.
  14 June 1963 – Above Nanchang a RoCAF RB-69A Neptune is shot down by 23 mm NR-23 cannon-fire from a PLAAF MiG-17PF "Fresco" killing all 14 crew aboard
  1 November 1963 – Above Jiagxi an SA-2 Guideline shoots down an RoCAF Lockheed U-2C. Pilot Yeh Chang Yi was returning from an intelligence mission where he took aerial photos of Jiayuguan missile test site and Lanzhou nuclear weapons plant. After detecting the first Guideline had been launched at him he made evasive maneuvers and avoided the first only to be struck by a second missile moments later knocking off his right wing. after bailing out and falling into captivity of the PRC he was held until 10 November 1982 when he was released into Hong Kong. He was eventually admitted into the United States after ROC officials denied his attempts to be repatriated.
  11 June 1964 – Near Yantai on the Shantung Peninsula Coordination between a MiG-17F "Fresco" and an Iluyshin Il-28 "Beagle" of the PLAAF supports the nighttime interception of an RoCAF RB-69A Neptune by dropping flares to illuminate the target plane allowing the fighter to shoot it down with cannon-fire.
  7 July 1964 – Flying above Fujian, RoCAF pilot Lee Nan Lee is shot down and killed after his Lockheed U-2G is targeted and struck by an SA-2 Guideline missile.
  18 December 1964 – Above Wenzhou, an RoCAF RF-101A Voodoo piloted by Hsieh Hsiangho is shot down by a People's Liberation Army Naval Air Force Shenyang J-6. He is captured by fishermen when he ejects above the ocean and detained until July 1985.
  10 January 1965 – Southwest of Beijing, On a mission to capture aerial photos of Paotow uranium enrichment plant using an infrared camera RoCAF pilot Chang Liyi is shot down after being struck by an SA-2 Guideline missile. He survives the crash with both legs broken, Captured he is held until 10 November 1982 when released into Hong Kong. He was eventually admitted into the United States after ROC officials denied his attempts to be repatriated.
  18 March 1965 – Above Guangdong near Shantou, a PLAAF MiG-19 "Farmer" piloted by Gao Chang Ji shoots down and kills RoCAF pilot Chang Yupao flying an RF-101C Voodoo.
  10 January 1966 – Above Matsu, PLAAF MiG-17 "Fresco" shoots down an RoCAF HU-16 Albatross attempting to carry defectors to Taiwan.
 10 January 1966 – A HU-16 of the Republic of China Air Force was shot down by People's Republic of China PLAAF MiG-17 over Matsu whilst transporting defectors to Taiwan.
 / (2) 13 January 1967 – Four F-104G Starfighters of the RoCAF are engaged by Twelve MiG-19 "Farmers" of the PLAAF. Two Farmers are claimed shot by Hu Shih-Lin and one by Bei-Puo Shih. F-104G No. 64-17779 involved in the engagement does not return and is believed to have been shot down.

Insurgency in Northeast India (1954–present)
  21 October 2022 – The PLA shot down an attack helicopter in Arunachal Pradesh with a bazooka and mortars, killing 5 soldiers.

Colombian conflict (1964–present) 
  4 August 2015 – A Black Hawk helicopter, for some investigations, was shot down by Clan del Golfo during an operation against the criminal organization in northwestern Colombia, killing 16 and injuring 2.

South African Border War (1966–1990) 
  22 September 1975 – A South African Aérospatiale SA 330 Puma helicopter is hit by Cuban Anti-aircraft fire during Operation Savannah. Two crew members die, the remaining 4 survive and avoid capture.
  4 January 1976 – Another South African Aérospatiale SA 330 Puma helicopter is shot down by friendly fire during Operation Savannah. Both crew members and 3 passengers die in the crash.
  13 March 1976 – A Fokker F-27 Friendship parked on the ground offloading arms at UNITA's Gago Coutinho aerodrome is caught by surprise by a group of four Cuban Air Force MiG-21 FM. Pilot Rafael Del Pino fires an S-24 unguided rocket destroying it.
  14 Marzo 1979 – A South African Canberra medium bomber crashes after the pilot is killed by enemy fire during an attack on Cahama, south of Ongiva.
  6 July 1979 – A South African Dassault Mirage III ID number 856 is shot down in Cunene, Angola.
  18 October 1979 – A South African Atlas Impala MKII is shot down by anti-aircraft fire; the pilot survives and is rescued.
  12 September 1980 – A South African Atlas Impala MKII from 8th SAAF Squadron is shot down in Angola, the pilot is declared MIA.
  10 October 1980 – A South African Atlas Impala MKII is shot down over South West of Mupa in Southern Angola by SA-7, the pilot, Lautenslager V.P. is killed by SWAPO rebels.
  1 June 1981 – A South African Atlas Impala MKII is shot down in Cuvelai, the pilot died in the crash.
  6 November 1981 – South African Air Force Major Johan Rankin flying a Mirage F-1CZ engaged a Cuban MiG-21 FM flown by Major Leonel Ponce, downing his MiG with a burst of 30 mm cannon.
  5 January 1982 – A South African Aérospatiale SA 330 Puma helicopter is downed by small arms fire, causing a hydraulic pipe to rupture. The helicopter crashed inverted. All 3 occupants died. 
  9 August 1982 – A South African Aérospatiale SA 330 Puma helicopter is hit by 23 mm anti-aircraft fire, causing it to crash inverted, the crew of 3 and 12 Paratroopers are killed. 
  5 October 1982 – Flying his Mirage F-1CZ, Major Johan Rankin engages two Cuban MiG-21 FM flown by Lieutenants Raciel Marrero Rodríguez and Gilberto Ortiz Pérez over Angola. Rankin downs the lead MiG with 30 mm cannon-fire followed by a launch of an Matra 550 missile, taking down the wingman. Cuba contests this claim, reporting that the two pilots returned to their base at Lubango airport with some battle damage.
 25 November 1985 – One Soviet Antonov An-12 was shot down in Cuando Cubango, Angola. Likely by a 9K31 Strela-1 system captured by South African Armed Forces.
  25 July 1986 – An Angolan Air Force Mig-23ML is shot down near Menongue, Angola. Pilot Captain Jorge González Pérez is killed.
  28 October 1987 – UNITA ground fire near Luvuei, Angola shoots down a Cuban MiG-21UM a two-seat variant of the type. Both Cuban crew eject and are captured by UNITA forces.
  14 November 1987 – A South African Atlas Impala MKII is shot down by Anti-aircraft fire in Cuvelai during a night mission.
  20 February 1988 – A South African Dassault Mirage F1 is shot down by an SA-13 fired by Cuban forces during a raid in Cuando Cubango, Angola.
  2 March 1988 – A Cuban Air Force Mig-21 piloted by Captain Juan Perez is shot down by friendly Anti-aircraft fire near Menongue.
  19 March 1988 – A South African Dassault Mirage F1 ID number 223 is shot down by a missile in Longa, north of Cuito Cuanavale during a night raid. The pilot, Captain Willie Van Coopehagen, dies in the crash.
  27 April 1988 – A Cuban Air Force AN-26 is shot down by friendly fire from 9K32 Strela-2 (SA-7) missiles and anti-aircraft cannons.
  4 May 1988 – A Cuban Air Force Mig-21 piloted by Carlos Rodriguez Perez is shot down by a UNITA missile.

Naxalite-Maoist insurgency (1967–present) 
  17 January 2013 – A helicopter Mil Mi-17 of Indian Air Force was shot down by Naxalites using a light machine gun and other rifles, in the crash there were some injureds.

Football War (1969) 
  (3) 17 July 1969 – Honduran Air Force Corsair pilots Captain Fernando and his wingman Captain Edgardo Acosta Soto engaged two Salvadoran TF-51D Cavalier Mustang II who were attacking another Corsair while it was strafing ground targets south of Tegucigalpa. Soto entered a turning engagement with one mustang and blew off its left wing with three bursts of 20 mm cannon, killing pilot Captain Douglas Varela when his parachute did not fully deploy. Later that day the pair spotted two Salvadoran FG-1D Goodyear Corsair. They jettisoned hard point stores before climbing and made a diving attack, Soto set one Corsair on fire only to find its wingman on his tail. An intense dogfight between them ended when Soto entered a Split-S giving him a firing solution which he used to shoot down Captain Guillermo Reynaldo Cortez who died when his Corsair exploded.

The Troubles (Late 1960s–1998) 

 British Army Gazelle downing (17 February 1978)
 British Army Lynx shootdown (23 June 1988)
 British Army Gazelle shootdown (11 February 1990)
 British Army Lynx shootdown (13 February 1991)
 British Army Lynx shootdown (20 March 1994)
  RAF Puma shootdown (12 July 1994)

Yom Kippur War (1973)
 Ofira Air Battle (6 October 1973)
 Al Mansoura Air Battle (14 October 1973)

Cyprus Conflict (1963–1974)
  8 August 1964 – On 8 August 1964, Turkey's military intervention during the Battle of Tylliria. He led a four-fighter flight of the 112th Air Squadron leaving Eskişehir Air Base around 17:00 local time for Cyprus. Topel's F-100 Super Sabre was hit by 40 mm anti-aircraft fire from a Greek Cypriot gun emplacement and shot-down as he was strafing the Arion, a Greek Cypriot patrol boat. He was able to eject from his aircraft and made a safe parachute jump over land.
  (2) 20 July 1974 – During the first day of the conflict, F-100D 55-3756 of 171.Filo and F-100C 54-2042 of 132.Filo were shot down by Greek Cypriot anti-aircraft fire. 
  (3) 20 July 1974 – During the first day of the Turkish air campaign, three transport planes – C-47 No.6035, a C-130 of 222.Filo and a C-160 of 221.Filo were damaged by Greek Cypriot anti-aircraft fire. All three salvaged, but played no further part in the conflict.
  20 July 1974 – During the first day of the conflict, RF-84F 52-7327 of 184.Filo was shot down by Greek Cypriot anti-aircraft fire.
  20 July 1974 – During the first day of the conflict, a Dornier Do-28D of the Turkish Air Force was shot down north-west of Nicosia.
  (3) 21 July 1974 – F-100D 55-2825 of 111.Filo, F-100C 54-2083 of 112.Filo and F-104G 64-17783 of 191.Filo were shot down by Turkish Navy destroyers.
  (2) 22 July 1974 – Turkish F-100D Super Sabres 54-2238 of 172.Filo and 54-22?? of 171.Filo were lost in action on 22 July over Cyprus due to enemy fire.
  22 July 1974 – A Turkish F-100C of 171.Filo was lost in a landing accident after returning from a combat sortie over Cyprus. Serial unknown.
  (2) 22 July 1974 – Two transport aircraft (53-234 and 52-144) were accidentally damaged by Greek Cypriot anti-aircraft fire. They managed to land safely in Crete but played no further part in the conflict.

Western Sahara War (1975–1991)
  21 January 1976 – A Moroccan Northrop F-5 was shot down by the Polisario Front using SA-7 Strela missiles.
  18 February 1978 – A Moroccan Northrop F-5 was shot down by the Polisario Front.
  10 October 1978 – A Moroccan Northrop F-5 was shot down by the Polisario Front using SA-7 Strela missiles.
  10 February 1979 – A Moroccan Northrop F-5 was shot down by the Polisario Front.
  12 October 1981 – A Moroccan Dassault Mirage F1 was shot down by the Polisario Front.
  13 October 1981(2) – A Moroccan Lockheed C-130 Hercules and Northrop F-5 a were shot down by the Polisario Front using soviet made missiles.
  26 September 1982 – A Moroccan Dassault Mirage F1 was shot down by the Polisario Front. Pilot Ten Mohamed Hadri was captured.
  12 January 1985– A Moroccan Dassault Mirage F1 was shot down by the Polisario Front near Mansoura Ahmed.
  (2) 13 January 1985 – Two Moroccan Northrop F-5 were shot down by the Polisario Front near the Algerian border.
  21 January 1985 – A Moroccan North American Rockwell OV-10 Bronco was shot down by the Polisario Front using 9K32 Strela-2 near Dakhla, Western Sahara.
  21 August 1987 – A Moroccan Northrop F-5 was shot down by the Polisario Front.

Cabinda War (1975–present)
  May 18 2005 – FLEC rebels shot down a military helicopter of the National Air Force of Angola.

Mozambican Civil War (1977–1994)
  November 1979 – Rhodesian helicopter was shot down by Mozambican troops while retuning from trip to Gorongossa.
  January 1987 – RENAMO claimed to have shot down unknown Mozambican helicopter.

Ogaden War (1977–1978)
  July 1977 – An Ethiopian F-5E is shot down by a SA-7 Grail MANPADs near Gode.
  July 1977 – An Ethiopian Douglas DC-3 cargo plane from Ethiopian Airlines is shot down.
  July 1977 – An Ethiopian Douglas C-47 is shot down by a pair of Somali MiG-17s.
  24 July 1977 – A Somali MiG-21 is shot down by an Ethiopian F-5E.
  (2) 25 July 1977 – Two Somali MiG-21 are shot down by Ethiopian F-5Es, another two MiG-21s collided in the same engagement.
  26 July 1977 – A Somali MiG-21 is shot down by an Ethiopian F-5E.
  19 August 1977 – A Somali MiG-21 is shot down by an Ethiopian F-5E.
  21 August 1977 – A Somali MiG-21 is shot down by an Ethiopian F-5E.
  (2) 1 September 1977 – Two Somali MiG-21 were shot down by a pair of Ethiopian F-5Es.

Kurdish–Turkish conflict (1978–present)
  23 February 2008 – a Turkish Army AH-1 Cobra helicopter crashed with PKK militants claiming the downing and posting a video. Turkey confirmed this later in the day, saying that the incident happened "due to an unknown reason".
  13 May 2016 – PKK militants shot down a Turkish Army AH-1W SuperCobra using a 9K38 Igla (SA-18 Grouse) MANPADS. In the published video, the missile severed the tail section from the rest of the helicopter, causing it to spin, fragment in midair and crash, killing the two pilots on board. The Turkish government initially claimed that it fell due to technical failure, it later became obvious that it had been shot down.
  10 February 2018 – YPG militants shot down a Turkish Air Force TAI/AgustaWestland T129 ATAK over Kırıkhan district of Hatay province killing two soldiers.
  12 February 2018 – Syrian Democratic Forces shot down a Turkish Air Force Bayraktar Tactical UAS over Afrin.
  18 October 2019 – A Turkish army Sikorsky UH-60 Black Hawk crashed during operations against the SDF near the border city of Ras Al-‘Ayn in Syria's Al-Hasakah Governorate.

Chadian-Libyan conflict (1978–1987)
  25 January 1984 – A French Air Force SEPECAT Jaguar is shot down by machine-gun fire from GUNT rebels, its pilot is killed.
  7 September 1987 – A Libyan Air Force Tupolev Tu-22 with an East German crew was shot down by a MIM-23 Hawk missile fired by French army while trying to bomb N'Djamena airport.

Soviet–Afghan War (1979–1989)

Salvadoran Civil War (1979–1992)
26 January 1981 – An Aero Commander operated by Aerolineas del Pacifico that was air-dropping arms and ammunition for rebels was destroyed by the Salvadoran Air Force at a small airstrip killing the co-pilot. The pilot was captured by the army.
  11 May 1981 – A Bell UH-1 Iroquois was hit by machinegun fire and crashed.
  (22) late January 1982 – Battle of Ilopango Airport
  17 June 1982 – A MD Helicopters MD 500 was shot down by FMLN.
  19 October 1984 – A Cessna O-2A was shot down by FMLN.
  12 April 1986 – A Bell UH-1 Iroquois was shot down by FMLN near San Miguel Air Base.
  18 November 1989 – A Cessna A-37 Dragonfly was shot down near San Miguel.
  (6) 17 October 1990 – Six Bell UH-1 Iroquois were destroyed in a FMLN attack.
  23 November 1990 – A Cessna A-37 Dragonfly was shot down using a surface to air missile.
  2 January 1991 – A Bell UH-1 Iroquois was shot down near Lolotique.
  19 December 1991 – A Bell UH-1 Iroquois was shot down by FMLN.

Iran–Iraq War (1980–1988)

  20 February 1986 – Iranian Air Force Fokker F27 Friendship is shot down by an Iraqi Air Force MiG-23 with a total of 49 killed including crew and passengers.
  17 January 1987 – An Iraqi MiG-23ML of unit 63FS shot down a F-14A piloted by Assl-e-Davtalab.
  19 July 1988 – Two Iraqi Dassault Mirage F1 of unit 115FS shot down two F-14A Tomcats by Super 530 missile.

Falklands War (1982)
  Argentine air forces shot down in the Falklands War: total 45 aircraft including 4 helicopters (Sea Harrier 21, Sea Dart missile 7, Sea Wolf missile 4, Stinger missile 2, Sea Cat missile 1, Rapier missile 1, Blowpipe missile 1, combination/gunfire 6, friendly fire 2), April 3 – June 14, 1982
  On 4 May 1982, Sea Harrier FRS.1 hit by anti-aircraft fire at Goose Green.
  (2) On 21 May 1982, a Gazelle AH.1s hit by small-arms fire at San Carlos. 
  On 21 May 1982, a Harrier GR.3 hit by Blowpipe missile at Port Howard.
  On 27 May 1982, a Harrier GR.3 hit by anti-aircraft fire at Goose Green.
  On 28 May 1982, a Scout AH.1 shot down by Pucara at Goose Green.
  On 30 May 1982, a Harrier GR.3 hit by anti-aircraft fire at Stanley.
  On 1 June 1982, a Sea Harrier FRS.1 hit by Roland missile at Stanley.
  On 6 June 1982, a British Army Gazelle friendly fire incident at Bluff Cove.

Libyan Gulf of Sidra territorial water dispute
  (2) 19 August 1981 – Gulf of Sidra incident (1981): two Su-22 Fitters of the Libyan Air Force attempted to intercept two American F-14 Tomcats over the Gulf of Sidra, off the coast of Sirte. Both Su-22s were shot down.
  15 April 1986 – One F-111F of the 48th Fighter Wing of the United States Air Force was shot down over Libya by ground fire during the 1986 United States bombing of Libya.
  (2) 4 January 1989 – 1989 air battle near Tobruk

Sri Lankan Civil War (1983–2009)
  13 September 1990 – A Sri Lanka airforce SIAI-Marchetti SF.260 was shot down near Palay killing the pilot.
  5 July 1992 – A Sri Lanka airforce Shaanxi Y-8 was shot down with a surface to air missile near Palaly killing 19. 
  14 July 1992 – A Sri Lanka airforce SIAI-Marchetti SF.260 was shot down killing the pilot.
  2 August 1994 – A Sri Lanka airforce Bell 212 was shot down by small arms fire.
  (2) 28 April 1995 – two Sri Lanka airforce Hawker Siddeley HS 748 were shot down near Palay by SA-7 anti-aircraft missiles, the shot downs cost the lives of 43 in the first shootdown and 52 in the second shootdown.
  14 July 1995 – A Sri Lanka airforce FMA IA 58 Pucará (tail number CA-601) was shot down by a MPADS killing the pilot. Pilot Flight Lieutenant Dilhan Perera was killed; his body was recovered by an air force rescue team.
  (2) 18 November 1995 – A Sri Lanka airforce Shaanxi Y-8 and a Mil Mi-24 were shot down near palay killing four in the Y-8.
  22 November 1995 – A Sri Lanka airforce Antonov An-32 charted from Kazakhstan was shot down near Jaffna killing 63 troops.
  22 January 1996 – A Sri Lanka airforce Mi-17-1V was shot down by LETTE killing 34.
  19 March 1996 – A Sri Lanka airforce Mi-24 was shot down off the coast of Mullaittivu killing seven.
  20 July 1996 – A Sri Lanka airforce Mil Mi-8 was shot down.
  (2) 10 November 1997 – A Sri Lanka airforce Mi-24 was shot down killing two and a Mil Mi-17 crashed landed after being hit.
  7 January 1998 – A Sri Lanka airforce Mil Mi-17 was hit with an RPG and mortars and was destroyed.
  26 June 1998 – A Sri Lanka airforce Mi-24 was shot down south of Vavunia killing four.
  17 December 1999 – A Sri Lanka airforce Mi-24 was shot down near Parantan killing four.
  18 February 2000 – A Sri Lanka airforce Bell 412 was shot down over Thenmaradchi killing two.
  24 May 2000 – A Sri Lanka airforce Mi-24 was shot killing two.
  19 October 2000 – A Sri Lanka airforce Mi-24 was shot near Nogar Covil.
  23 October 2000 – A Sri Lanka airforce Mi-24 was shot near the Trincomalee harbour.
  22 October 2007 – Raid on Anuradhapura Air Force Base: One Bell 212 gunship of the Sri Lankan army either suffered a mechanical failure or was shot down during the attack, killing all four of its crew members.
  (2) 20 February 2009 – 2009 suicide air raid on Colombo: Two Zlin Z-143 light aircraft laden with explosives and flown by two LTTE suicide pilots were shot down by anti-aircraft fire. One impacted a building and detonated; the other crashed before it could reach its target.

Lord's Resistance Army insurgency (1987-present)
  25 December 2008 - LRA claimed the downing of an Ugandan military helicopter in the Democratic Republic of Congo.

First Nagorno-Karabakh War (1988–1994)
  20 November 1991 – 1991 Azerbaijani Mil Mi-8 shootdown
  28 January 1992 – 1992 Azerbaijani Mil Mi-8 shootdown – A civilian Azerbaijani helicopter of Azal airlines is shot down by MANPADs fire from Armenian forces.
  3 March 1992 – a Russian Federation Mi-26 cargo helicopter and a Mi-24 attack helicopter designed as an escort delivered food to an Armenian village in Polistan. On the way back evacuating civilians and wounded the cargo helicopter is attacked by an Azerbaijani Mi-8, the escort thwarted the attack back. However, MANPADS fire launched from the ground shot down the Mi-26 near the Azerbaijani village of Seidilyar. Of the 50 people on board, 12 were killed.
  12 May 1992 – A Russian Federation Mi-26 is shot down by Armenian MANPAD fire in Tavush province, Armenia. Six crewmen died. 
  8 August 1992 – An Azerbaijani Mi-24 is shot down by Armenian ZU-23-2 anti-aircraft guns, one Armenian 57 mm S-60 gun was destroyed in the same engagement.
  20 August 1992 – An Azerbaijani two seat MiG-25PD is shot down, one of the pilots was Alexander Belichenko a Ukrainian national, after being captured by Armenian authorities he is sentenced to death by the Constitutional Court of Armenia. However, diplomatic negotiations by the presidents of Russia, Armenia and Azerbaijan allowed the pardon of Belichenko and other mercenary pilots of Azerbaijan.
  4 September 1992 – An Azerbaijani Mig-21 is shot down by Armenian fire, the pilot is captured.
  12 September 1992 – An Armenian Mi-24 is shot down by Azerbaijani fire.
  18 September 1992 – An Azerbaijani Mi-24 is shot down by Armenian anti-aircraft gunners.
  10 October 1992 – An Azerbaijani Su-25 is shot down by Armenian fire in Malibeyli, the pilot could not managed to eject and perished.
  12 November 1992 – An Armenian Mi-24 is shot down by Azerbaijani fire.
  7 December 1992 – An Azerbaijani Mi-24 is shot down by Armenian fire the Martuni region.
  7 December 1992 – An Azerbaijani Su-25 is shot down by Armenian fire the Martuni region.
  13 June 1992 – An Azerbaijani Su-25 piloted by Vagif Gurbanov was shot down. Gurbanov was killed and awarded the title National Hero of Azerbaijan. 
  15 January 1993 – An Azerbaijani Mig-21 was shot down by Armenian fire.
  1 September 1993 – An Azerbaijani Mi-24 was shot down by Armenian fire.
  18 January 1994 – An Armenian Su-25 is shot down by Azerbaijani fire.
  17 February 1994 – An Azerbaijan Mig-21 is shot down in Vedenis region of Armenia, the pilot is captured.
  17 March 1994 – Iranian Air Force C-130 was shot down by Armenian forces en route from Moscow to Iran.
  23 April 1994 – An Azerbaijani attack by 7 Su-25 in Stepanakert ends with one Su-25 shot down by air defense. The Azerbaijani side acknowledged the loss but described it as an accident.

Later Nagorno-Karabakh conflict 1994–present
  12 September 2011 – A UAV was reportedly shot down by the ARDA over the airspace of the unrecognized Republic of Artsakh. Preliminary investigations carried out by the ARDA have determined the model to be a Hermes 450 drone.
  12 November 2014 – An Armenian Mil Mi-24 is shot down by Azerbaijani forces, killing the crew of three.
  2 April 2016 – During a clash between Azerbaijani and Armenian forces, an Azerbaijani Mil Mi-24 helicopter was shot down by Artsakh Republic forces. The downing was confirmed by the Azerbaijani defense ministry.
  21 April 2020 – An Azerbaijani Orbiter-3 UAV was shot down by an Armenian 9K33 Osa missile system over the Artsakh.
  (2) 27 September 2020 – The Defense Ministry of Azerbaijan confirmed the loss of one helicopter but said that the crew survived the crash. On late December 2020 Armenian social media published footage of an Azerbaijani Mi-17 helicopter crashing in Nagorno Karabakh. Lt. Coronel Ramiz Gasimov, the pilot, is seen ejecting the helicopter; however, he died by wounds after being in coma on 22 October 2020. During the war Azerbaijan officially recognized losing two helicopters.
  28 September 2020 – An Azerbaijani Antonov An-2 was shot down by Armenian anti-aircraft artillery near the town of Martuni, Nagorno-Karabakh.
  29 September 2020 – Armenian Defense Ministry claimed that an Armenian Air Force Su-25 was shot down by a Turkish Air Force F-16 killing the pilot. However, Turkey denied the event.
  4 October 2020, An Azerbaijani Air force Su-25 attack aircraft is shot down by Armenian forces while targeting Armenian positions in Fuzuli. The pilot, Col. Zaur Nudiraliyev died in the crash. Azerbaijani officials acknowledged the loss in December 2020.
  19 October 2020, A Turkish-made Bayraktar TB2 operated by Azerbaijan is reported shot down by air defense weapons of Armenian Army over the skies of Nagorno-Karabakh.
  8 November 2020, another Azerbaijani Bayraktar TB2 was shot down by air defense weapons on southeastern Nagorno Karabakh.
  9 November 2020 – A Russian Mi-24 combat helicopter was shot down by Azerbaijani forces near the border with Armenia. Two crewmembers died and a third was wounded. The government of Azerbaijan stated the shootdown was an accident and offered an apology.

Gulf War (1990–1991)

Iraqi no-fly zones (1991–2003)
  20 March 1991 – USAF F-15C vs. IRAF Su-22 – In accordance with the ceasefire, an F-15C shoots down an Iraqi Su-22 bomber with an AIM-9 missile.
 27 December 1992 – USAF F-16 vs. IRAF MiG-25 – A MiG-25 crossed the no-fly zone and an F-16D shot it down with an AIM-120 AMRAAM missile. It is the first kill with an AIM-120, and also the first USAF F-16 kill.
  17 January 1993 – USAF F-16 vs. IRAF MiG-23 – A USAF F-16C shoots down a MiG-23 when the MiG locks the F-16 up.
  (2) 14 April 1994 – UH-60 Black Hawk friendly fire shootdown incident
  23 December 2002 – USAF RQ-1 Predator vs. IRAF MiG-25 – In what was the last aerial victory for the Iraqi Air Force before Operation Iraqi Freedom, an Iraqi MiG-25 shot down an American UAV RQ-1 Predator after the drone opened fire on the Iraqi aircraft with a Stinger missile.

Croatian War of Independence (1991–1995)
  1992 European Community Monitor Mission helicopter downing (7 January 1992)

First Abkhazia War (1992–93)
  – 5 September 1992: A Georgian Army helicopter is shot down by 14.5 mm heavy machine-gun fire from Abkhazian fighters.
  – 14 December 1992: Georgian forces shot down a Russian Mi-8 helicopter using SA-14 MANPADs, killing 3 crew members and 56 passengers, mostly Russian refugees.
  – December 1992: Russian and Abkhazian force shot down a Georgian Mi-8 with a SA-7 or SA-14 missile.
  – 15 January 1993: Georgian forces shot down a Russian Su-25 ground attack fighter near Tkvaritchely.
  – 15 January 1993: A Georgian Mi-8 helicopter is shot down in the area as well.
  – 19 March 1993: A Russian Air Force Su-27S flew to intercept two Georgian Su-25s approaching the Suchumi area, the Russian Su-27 was destroyed by a SA-2 missile. The Pilot, Maj. Schipko was killed. 
  – 3 July 1993: Georgian forces shot down a Russia Su-25 over Suchumi.
  – 4 July 1993: Georgian forces shot down two Russian aircraft one Yak-52 reconnaissance aircraft and a Mi-8T during the Siege of Tkvarcheli.
  – 4 July 1993: Russian and Abkhazian forces shot down a Georgian Su-25 with a SA-14 fire over Nizhnaya Eshera. 
  – 5 July 1993: Georgian forces reported the loss of a Su-25 to friendly fire.
  – 7 July 1993: Abkhazians shot down a Georgian Mi-8 while evacuating refugees from Suchumi, killing 20 persons.
  – 30 September 1993: Abkhazians shot down another Georgian Mi-8 near Racaka.
  – 4 October 1993: Abkhazians shot down another Georgian Mi-8 transporting 60 refugees en route from Abkhazia to Svanetya.
  – December 1993: Abkhazians shot down a Georgian helicopter, likely a Mi-24 before OSCE Ceasefire.

Bosnian War (1992–1995)
  3 September 1992 – An Italian Air Force (Aeronautica Militare Italiana) G.222 was shot down when approaching Sarajevo airfield, while conducting a United Nations relief mission. It crashed  from the airfield; a NATO rescue mission was aborted when 2 USMC CH-53 helicopters came under small arms fire. The cause of the crash was determined to be a surface-to-air missile, but it was not clear who fired it. Everyone on board – four Italian crew members and four French passengers – died in the crash.
  (5) 28 February 1994 – Banja Luka incident
 16 April 1994 – A Sea Harrier of the 801 Naval Air Squadron, operating from the aircraft carrier HMS Ark Royal, was brought down by an Igla-1 surface-to-air missile fired by the Army of Republika Srpska while attempting to bomb two Bosnian Serb tanks over Gorazde. The pilot, Lieutenant Nick Richardson, ejected and landed in territory controlled by friendly Bosnian Muslims.
  2 June 1995: USAF F-16 piloted by Captain Scott O’Grady shot down by a Serb SA-6. Pilot rescued by Marines seven days after shoot-down. See Mrkonjić Grad incident 
  30 August 1995 – one French Air Force Mirage 2000N-K2 was shot down over Bosnia by a MANPADS heat-seeking 9K38 Igla missile fired by air defence units of Army of Republika Srpska during operation Deliberate Force. Both pilots were captured by Serbian forces.

United Nations Operation in Somalia (1992–1995)
  (2) 3 October 1993 – Battle of Mogadishu (1993)

Venezuelan coup d'état attempt (November 1992) 
  (3) 27 November 1992 – Three OV-10 Bronco aircraft flown by rebel pilots were shot down over Caracas, at least one by a loyalist F-16.

Aegean dispute 
  On 18 June 1992, a Greek Mirage F1CG crashed near the island of Agios Efstratios in the Northern Aegean, during a low-altitude dogfight with two Turkish F-16s. Greek pilot Nikolaos Sialmas was killed in the crash.
  Οn 8 February 1995, a Turkish F-16C crashed on the sea after being intercepted by a Greek Mirage F1CG. The Turkish pilot Mustafa Yildirim bailed out and was rescued by a Greek helicopter. After brief hospitalization in Rhodes, the pilot was handed over to the Turkish side.
  On 27 December 1995, a pair of Greek F-16Cs intercept a pair of Turkish F-4E. During the dogfight that followed, one of the Turkish aircraft went into a steep dive and crashed into the sea, killing its pilot Altug Karaburun. The co-pilot Ogur Kilar managed to bail out safely and was rescued by a Greek ΑΒ-205 helicopter. He was returned to Turkey after receiving first aid treatment in Lesbos.
 On 8 October 1996 – 7 months after the escalation of the dispute with Turkey over the Imia/Kardak islands, a Greek Mirage 2000 fired an R.550 Magic II missile and shot down a Turkish F-16D over the Aegean Sea. The Turkish pilot died, while the co-pilot ejected and was rescued by Greek forces. In August 2012, after the downing of a RF-4E on the Syrian Coast, Turkish Defence Minister İsmet Yılmaz confirmed that the Turkish F-16D was shot down by a Greek Mirage 2000 with an R.550 Magic II in 1996 after reportedly violating Greek airspace near Chios island. Greece denies that the F-16 was shot down. Athens says that Turkish pilot reported a control failure. It also claims that the jet violated Greece's airspace because one of the Turkish pilots was rescued in the Greek flight information region. Both Mirage 2000 pilots reported that the F-16 caught fire and they saw one parachute.
 / On 23 May 2006, a Greek F-16 and a Turkish F-16 collided approximately 35 nautical miles south off the island of Rhodes, near the island of Karpathos during a Turkish reconnaissance flight involving two F-16Cs and a RF-4. Greek pilot Kostas Iliakis was killed, whereas the Turkish pilot Halil İbrahim Özdemir bailed out and was rescued by a cargo ship.
  In April 2018, Greek Air Force jet crashed into the Aegean Sea on Thursday, killing the pilot, as he returned from a mission to intercept Turkish aircraft that had violated the country's airspace, Greek officials said. Greek officials said nothing about what might have caused the crash, or whether it was connected to a confrontation with Turkish jets, though they stressed that the crash occurred several kilometers from the site of the interception mission.

Insurgency in Ogaden (1994–2018)
  18 July 2006 – An Ethiopian airforce Mil Mi-8 was shot down by the Ogaden National Liberation Front near Gabo Gabo killing 26.

Cenepa War (1995)
  29 January 1995 – A Peruvian Mil Mi-8 was shot down by Ecuadorian forces using a Blowpipe missile between Base Sur and Coangos, killing five.
  7 February 1995 – A Peruvian Mil Mi-24 was shot down by Ecuadorian forces using a 9K38 Igla missiles at Base Sur, killing three.
  ("3") 11 February 1995 – Two Peruvian Sukhoi Su-22 and a Cessna A-37 Dragonfly were shot down by Ecuadorian Dassault Mirage F1s and IAI Kfir.
  11 February 1995 – An Ecuadorian A-37 was shot down by Peruvian forces using MANPADS.
  17 February 1995 – A Peruvian Mil Mi-8 was hit by AAA fire and crash landed.

Eritrean–Ethiopian War (1998–2000)
  2 June 1998 – An Ethiopian MiG-23BN was shot down by Eritrean anti-aircraft fire while doing a bombing run on Asmara International Airport.
  6 June 1998 – An Ethiopian Mig-21 was shot down by Eritrean anti-aircraft fire.
  6 June 1998 – An Etrirean Aermacchi MB-339 was shot down by Ethriopia north of Mekelle.
  14 February 1999 – An Ethiopian Mi-24 Attack helicopter ethier crashed or was shot down near Burre.
  25 February 1999 – An Eritrean Mig-29 was shot down by a R-73 Air to air missile fired from a Su-27, the Mig-29 crashed near Badme.
  26 February 1999 – An Eritrean Mig-29 was shot down near Badme by an Ethiopian Su-27 piloted by Aster Tolossa.
  (2) On 26 February 1999, Two Ethiopian Mig-21 were shot down by Eritrean MIG-29s.
  15 May 2000 – An Ethiopian Mi-35 was shot down attacking a water tank near Barentu by Eritrean ZSU-23 fire.
  16 May 2000 – An Eritrean MiG-29 was shot down my Ethiopian Su-27s.
  16 May 2000 – An Eritrean MiG-29 was damaged by an Ethiopian Su-27s and later crash landed at Asmara.

NATO bombing of Yugoslavia (1999)
  (2) 24 March 1999 – two Yugoslav Air Force MiG-29 were shot down by two USAF F-15C with AMRAAM missiles.
  24 March 1999 – During Operation Allied Force, Royal Netherlands Air Force F-16AM J-063 flown by Major Peter Tankink shot down one Yugoslavian MiG-29, flown by Lt. Colonel Milutinović, with an AMRAAM missile. The pilot of the stricken jet ejected safely. This marked the first air-to-air kill made by a Dutch fighter since WW2.
  (2) 26 March 1999 – two Yugoslavian MiG-29 were shot down by two USAF F-15C with AMRAAM missiles.
  27 March 1999 – 1999 F-117A shoot-down An American F-117A Nighthawk stealth bomber was shot down over Belgrade by a Soviet made S-125E (NATO: SA-3). The pilot ejected safely and the plane's wreckage was recovered by Serbian special forces. It was the only stealth aircraft to be shot down by a surface to air missile.
  2 May 1999 – a USAF F-16CG was shot down over Serbia. It was downed by an S-125 Neva SAM (NATO: SA-3) near Nakucani. Its pilot; Lt. Col David Goldfein, 555th Fighter Squadron commander, managed to eject and was later rescued by a combat search-and-rescue (CSAR) mission. The remains of this aircraft are on display in the Yugoslav Aeronautical Museum, Belgrade International Airport.
  4 May 1999 – A lone Yugoslav MiG-29 flown by Lt. Col. Milenko Pavlović attempted to intercept a large NATO formation that was returning to base having just bombed Valjevo (the pilot's home town). It was engaged by a pair of USAF F-16CJs from the 78th Fighter Squadron and shot down with AIM-120, killing the pilot with the falling wreckage also being hit by a Strela 2M fired by the Yugoslav army in error.

India–Pakistan military confrontation (1996, 1999 and 2019)

  26 August 1996 – During the Siachen conflict over the disputed Siachen Glacier region in Kashmir, an Indian Mi-17 helicopter was shot down by Pakistani forces with a surface to air missile. Four crew members died in the crash.
  2 July 1997 – During the Siachen conflict over the disputed Siachen Glacier region in Kashmir, an Indian HAL Cheetah helicopter was shot down by Pakistani forces. Both pilots died in the crash.
  27 May 1999 – During the Kargil War in the Kashmir region, one Indian Air Force MiG-27 was lost to an engine problem. Its wingman, flying in a MiG-21 was shot down by a MANPADS while trying to locate the downed MiG-27 pilot.
  28 May 1999 – An Indian Air Force strike formation composed by four Mi-17 helicopters came under fire by MANPADS, one was hit and shot down, killing all four on board.
  10 August 1999 – Pakistan Naval Air Arm Atlantique shootdown. The Atlantique plane was shot down by an IAF MiG-21 of the 45th Indian Air Force Squadron using a R-60 infrared homing missile.
  27 February 2019 – India confirmed that it lost one MiG-21 from the 51st fighter squadron in an air skirmish with the Pakistan Air Force (PAF).

Second Chechen War (1999–2009)

 Khankala Mi-26 shootdown (19 August 2002)

War in Afghanistan (2001–2016)

Iraq War (2003–2011)

Kivu conflict (2004–present)
  (2) 27 January 2017 – Two helicopters operated by mercenaries were shot down by M23 rebels near the town of Rutshuru.
 United Nations 28 March 2022 – A United Nations peacekeeping helicopter carrying eight was shot down by M23 Rebels.
  17 June 2022 – A Congolese helicoper gunship was shot down by M23 Rebels in North Kivu.

Chadian Civil War (2005–2010)
  28 November 2006 – Chadian Air Force plane was shot down by UFDD rebels near the town of Abeche. Rebels also claimed to have shot down a helicopter which was not confirmed by the government.

2006 Lebanon War
  12 August 2006 – Hezbollah fighters shot down an Israeli CH-53 Yas'ur with an anti-tank missile, killing five air crew members.

Mexican drug war (2006–present)
  1 May 2015 – A Mexican airforce Eurocopter EC725 (sometimes incorrectly referred to as a Blackhawk) was shot down by Jalisco New Generation Cartel using RPG-7s. The helicopter crashed, killed eight on board.

Russo-Georgian War (2008)

  (3) 20 April 2008 – Georgian officials claimed a Russian MiG-29 shot down a Georgian Hermes 450 unmanned aerial vehicle and provided video footage from the ill-fated drone showing an apparent MiG-29 launching an air-to-air missile at it. Russia denies that the aircraft was theirs and says they did not have any pilots in the air that day. Abkhazia's administration claimed its own forces shot down the drone with an L-39 aircraft "because it was violating Abkhaz airspace and breaching ceasefire agreements". UN investigation concluded that the video was authentic and that the drone was shot down by a Russian MiG-29 or Su-27 using a R-73 heat seeking missile.
  8 August 2008 – The first Russian Air Force loss of the campaign was a Su-25, piloted by Lieutenant Colonel Oleg Terebunsky of the 368th Attack Aviation Regiment. It was shot down over South Ossetia near the Zarsk pass, between Dzhava and Tskhinvali. It was hit by friendly fire, a MANPADS missile fired by South Ossetian militia at around 18:00. Earlier in the day, a flight of four Georgian Air Force Su-25 planes had attacked a Russian army convoy in the same area. This was one of the few missions conducted by Georgia's Su-25s during the brief conflict Georgia believed its aircraft would soon become easy targets for Russian interceptors. The Georgian aircraft returned to their bases and were hidden under camouflage netting to prevent them from being located.
  9 August 2008 – a Russian Tu-22M3 was shot down in South Ossettia by a Georgian Buk-M1 surface-to-air-missile system during the Russo-Georgian War. Three of the four crew members were killed, while the co-pilot was taken POW by Georgian forces.
  9 August 2008 – A Russian Su-24 was shot down by Georgian air defense forces with an anti-aircraft missile south of Tskhinvali during the morning. Both pilots ejected, but the co-pilot died impacting the ground when his parachute was damaged by fire. The wounded pilot was captured by Georgian forces. This loss was not initially acknowledged by Russia, while verified later by independent sources. The captured pilot, Major Igor Zinov, was shown on Georgian TV while being hospitalized together with the co-pilot of the downed Tu-22MR.
  9 August 2008 – A Russian Su-25 piloted by Colonel Sergey Kobylash, commander of the 368th Attack Aviation Regiment, was hit by a Georgian MANPADS during a daylight strafing run on a Georgian military formation south of Tskhinvali, on the Gori-Tskhinvali road at 10:30: after making his initial approach, Kolybash's aircraft was struck by a missile that hit his left engine, destroying it. Not long after, as Kobylash was returning to base at an altitude of 1000 meters, a second MANPADS missile struck his right engine, leaving the plane without thrust. Kobylash was able to glide to Russian controlled territory before ejecting north of Tskhinvali in a South Ossetian village of the Georgian enclave in the Great Liakh gorge, where he was recovered by a Russian combat search-and-rescue team. Shortly after Kobylash was rescued, South Ossetian militants claimed they had downed a Georgian Su-25; however, Georgian Air Force did not operate since the day before, likely making the second fatal hit on this Su-25 another friendly fire incident.
  9 August 2008 – The final Russian aircraft lost in combat was a Su-24, which was shot down by friendly forces while it was escorting a Russian column on the Tskhinvali-Gori highway, when it was hit by a Russian SAM. The crew ejected and was recovered by a search-and-rescue helicopter.

Boko Haram insurgency (2009–present)
  11 September 2014 – One Nigerian Air Force Alpha Jet either crashed or was shot down while on operations against Boko Haram near the town of Yola. The two pilots were captured and later beheaded.
  31 March 2021 – One Nigerian Air Force Alpha Jet 475 serial number 475 crashed. Boko Haram released footage purportedly showing themselves downing the plane.

Syrian Civil War (2011–present)

First Libyan Civil War (2011)

Nigerian bandit conflict (2011–present)
  19 July 2021 – In a rare case of a military jet being brought down by a criminal gang, one Nigerian Air Force Alpha Jet was shot down by bandits in Kaduna State after a combat mission against the gangs and coming under intense ground fire. The pilot ejected and evaded capture till reaching an Army base.

Central African Republic Civil War (2012–present) 
  23 March 2013 – Séléka rebels allegedly shot down helicopter while advancing on Bangui.

Second Libyan Civil War (2014–2020)
  22 March 2015 – One NSG fighter jet was shot down on 24 March 2015 at Al-Zintan by LNA fighters near Al-Zintan airport.
  6 May 2015 – One NSG MiG-25PU jet fighter operated by Libyan Dawn group was lost over Zintan, the pilot was captured by Libyan National Army forces.
  ("2") 11 June 2015 – Two NSG L-39 Fighters operated by Libyan Dawn group from Misrata are destroyed by ISIS fighters in an Airbase in Sirte.
  4 January 2016 – A LNA MiG-23ML serial number "6472" crashes near Benina airbase, the pilot ejected and survived.
  8 February 2016 – A LNA MiG-23ML serial number "6132" crashed near Derna after attacking Islamic State positions.
  12 February 2016 – LNA MiG-23UB crashed or was shot down near Qaryounis district. The pilots ejected and survived.
  18 May 2016 – A Libyan Mig-21 crashed upon landing in Tobruk.
  2 June 2016 – A GNA Dassault Mirage F1 fighter crashes after taking-off by a mechanical failure, 30 km of Sirte.
  5 July 2016 – A LNA MiG-23BN fighter crashed after a technical failure.
  10 August 2016 – A L-39 is shot down possibly by ISIS militants fire near Sirte.
  22 December 2016 – A NSG Mig-23UB operated by Libyan Dawn Group from Misrata crashed in unknown circumstances en route to Tarhuna.
  15 January 2017 – A LNA Mig-23ML is lost over Ganfouda/Bosnib area, near Benghazi during a combat mission.
  18 March 2017 – A LNA Mig-21 shot down by a heat seeking missile fired by Jihadists near Suq al-Hut. 
  29 March 2017 – A LNA Mig-21 fighter crashed result of a technical failure on a house killing his 3 occupants, the pilot dies as well.
  29 July 2017 – A LNA Mig-21, was shot down by the Islamists during its bombing raid on the town of Derna. Pilots ejected safely but were captured by the Islamists and executed.
  10 April 2019 – LNA forces claim to have shot down a GNA L-39 that took off from Misrata.
  14 April 2019 – GNA forces shot down a LNA MiG-21MF in the area of Ain Zara, Tripoli, with a Chinese-made FN-6 MANPADS, its pilot Jamal Ben Amer ejected safely and survived, being retrieved by LNA Mi-35 helicopter.
  23 April 2019 – A GNA Dassault Mirage F1 is shot down possibly by friendly fire or by GNA forces. 
  7 May 2019 – A GNA Government Dassault Mirage F1 is shot down by Haftar forces. The pilot was captured by LNA forces.
  14 May 2019 – A GNA drone is destroyed by LNA defenses in Al-Jufra area.
  ("2") 6 June 2019 – Two GNA Bayraktar TB2 drones are destroyed along an operation room by LNA attacks on Mitiga Airport. 
  13 June 2019 – A GNA L-39 fighter is lost by enemy fire or a technical failure on Al-Dafiniya.
  13 June 2019 – A GNA Air force helicopter is reported shot down by the LNA near the city of Misrata. GNA acknowledged the loss of the helicopter but ruled out it was shot down and attributed the loss to an accident.
  30 June 2019 – A GNA Bayraktar Tactical UAS drone is destroyed by LNA defenses.
  4 July 2019 – A GNA Air Force L-39 is shot down by General Haftar forces near Tarhuna, 80 km southeast of Tripoli. GNA forces acknowledged the loss. 
  ("2") 25 July 2019 – Two LNA Ilyushin Il-76TD cargo planes are destroyed in the ground in al-Jufra Air base by an attack made by Bayraktar TB2 drones.
  25 July 2019 – A GNA Bayraktar TB2 drone is shot down near al-Jufra airbase during the same attack.
  ("2") July 2019 – Two GNA Orbiter-3 scout drones are destroyed by LNA defenses one in Tripoli and another in Sidra. 
  3 August 2019 – A LNA Wing Loong II combat drone is shot down by the GNA defenses over Misrata.
  6 August 2019 – A GNA Ilyushin Il-76TD cargo plane is destroyed in the ground on Misrata Airport by a LNA Wing Long drone.
  7 August 2019 – A GNA L-39 fighter reported destroyed by LNA armed forces when landing in Misrata.
  18 October 2019 – A LNA Wing Loong II combat drone is shot down in Misrata by a surface-air missile.
  21 November 2019 – An Italian MQ-9 Reaper UAV is shot down by LNA air defense forces in Suq al Ahad area, north of Tarhouna. According to LNA Spokesperson Ahmad al-Mesmari the Italian drone was violating the LNA airspace. The drone was believed to be shot down by Pantsir air defenses.
  21 November 2019 – A US MQ-9 Reaper UAV is shot down over Libya, AFRICOM officials believed the drone was shot down by Russian defense systems.
  7 December 2019 – A LNA Mig-23ML is shot down by GNA forces in the Yarmouk frontline in southern Tripoli and crashed in Al-Zawiya city. The pilot ejected and was captured by GNA forces.
  14 December 2019 – A GNA Bayraktar TB2 drone is shot down in Ain Zara, Tripoli.
  2 January 2020 – A GNA Bayraktar TB2 drone is shot down south of Mitiga Airport, Tripoli.
  22 January 2020 – A GNA Bayraktar TB2 drone with GNA markings is shot down by LNA forces after taking off from Mitiga International Airport.
  28 January 2020 – A LNA Wing Loong II combat drone is shot down near Misrata.
  25 February 2020 – The LNA shoot down a GNA Turkish made Bayraktar TB2 drone, providing a video of the wreck.
  26 February 2020 – The LNA shoot down another GNA Turkish-made Bayraktar TB2 drone, providing video of the wreck.
  ("2") 28 February 2020 – LNA shot down two GNA drones in Qasr bin Ghashir and Wadi al-Rabie.
  ("2") 31 March 2020 – LNA shot down two GNA Bayraktar TB2 combat drones near Tripoli; one in Misrata Air College and another in Al-Tawaisha.
  2 April 2020 – LNA forces air defences shot down a GNA L-39 fighter, near Abu Qurayn. Both pilots were killed.
  5 April 2020 – An Antonov An-26 transport plane was destroyed on an airstrip near Tarhuna, Libya. Forces of the Government of National Accord (GNA) reported that it had shot an Antonov cargo plane carrying ammunition for Libyan National Army (LNA) militias. LNA confirmed the attack but stated that the aircraft carried medical supplies.
  5 April 2020 – A GNA Bayraktar TB2 drone is shot down by LNA forces in Alwashka, Libya.
  6 April 2020 – A GNA IAI Harpy/Harop loitering munition drone is reported destroyed in Libya.
  11 April 2020 – A GNA Bayraktar TB2 drone is shot down in Tarhuna.
  14 April 2020 – A GNA Dassault Mirage F1 fighter is shot down by LNA forces operating Pantsir-S.
  16 April 2020 – A GNA Bayraktar TB2 drone was shot down near Tarhuna.
  ("2") 17 April 2020 – Two GNA Bayraktar TB2 drones are shot down; one near Bani Walid and another in the South near Wadi dinar.
  18 April 2020 – A GNA Bayraktar TB2 drone is shot down by LNA forces south of Tripoli.
  19 April 2020 – A combat drone is shot down in Alwhaska, near Misrata, GNA sources claimed the downed drone was a LNA. Wing Loong II in turn LNA claimed they shot down a TAI Anka combat drone; however, a UN Security Council report asserted the downed drone was a TAI Anka drone operated by GNA.
  2 May 2020 – A GNA Bayraktar TB2 drone is destroyed at Arada, near Mitiga Airport, downed by LNA forces.
  9 May 2020 – Mortar fire from LNA forces struck Tripoli's Mitiga International Airport destroying a GNA Airforce Il-78 Military Transport.
  12 May 2020 – A GNA Bayraktar TB2 drone is shot down near Ash Shwayrif, Tripoli.
  17 May 2020 – LNA and GNA sources dispute the shot down of an enemy combat drone dear Al-Watiya Airbase.
  ("2") 21 May 2020 – Libyan National Army's Pantsir missile system shot down two GNA drones; one TAI Anka drone near Tarhuna city and one Bayraktar TB2 drone near Jebel Sherif.
  24 May 2020 – One LNA Wing Loong II combat drone is shot down by friendly fire from LNA Pantsir air defenses over Libya.
  7 June 2020 – A GNA Bayraktar TB2 drone was shot down by LNA forces near Sirte.
  8 June 2020 – A GNA Bayraktar TB2 drone was shot down by LNA forces as it attempted to bomb LNA forces in Sirte.
  22 August 2022 – A US MQ-9 Reaper UAV was shot down over Libya by a Pantsir air defense system.

War in Donbas (2014–present)

Saudi Arabian-led intervention in Yemen (2015–present)

Insurgency in Northern Chad (2016–present) 
  29 April 2021 – rebels from FACT claimed to have destroyed a helicopter near Nokou in Kanem. A military spokesman stated that the helicopter claimed to have been shot down by rebels crashed due to "technical failures" far from the battlefield.

Insurgency in Cabo Delgado (2017–present) 
  8 April 2020 – Mozambique Air Force Gazelle helicopter was damaged by small arms fire by ISIS and reportedly crashed down. ISIS released footage of the downed helicopter.
  23 June 2021 – Mozambique Air Force Mil Mi-17 crashed after being hit by small arms fire near Afungi camp.

Persian Gulf crisis (2019–present) 
  20 June 2019 – 2019 Iranian shoot-down of American drone: The Iranian Revolutionary Guard Corps shot down an American RQ-4A Global Hawk over the Strait of Hormuz. The United States responded with cyberattacks against Iranian air defense infrastructure.
  18 July 2019 – The Pentagon alleged that the amphibious assault ship  shot down or jammed at least one Iranian drone during operations in the Persian Gulf. Iranian officials denied this claim.

Tigray War (2020–2022)
  On 29 November 2020, an Ethiopian Air Force MiG-23 crashed during the Tigray conflict near Abiy Addi, 50 kilometers west of Mekelle. The pilot ejected and was captured by the Tigray People's Liberation Front who claimed they shot it down, showing the pilot with his Zsh-7 flying helmet (originally intended for Su-27 and MiG-29), a flight suit, a MiG-23 English manual and the crash site with charred metal parts.
  On 6 December 2020, an Ethiopian Air Force MiG-23 crashed 425 meters from Shire Inda Selassie airport.
  On 20 April 2021, An Ethiopian Mi-35 either crashed or was shot down near Guya killing three. The TDF claims to have shot it down and released a video of the crashed helicopter.
  On 23 June 2021, An Ethiopian Air Force Lockheed L-100 Hercules, serial number 5022 carrying explosives, military officers, and Eritrean camouflage uniforms was shot down near Gijet.
  On 11 November 2021, an Ethiopian Mi-35 helicopter was shot down by the TDF in the district of Mille.
On 24 August 2022, the Ethiopian Air Force shot down a plane carrying weapons that suspected to transport arms to the Tigray People's Liberation Front in the Ethiopia–Sudan border. Sudanese officials denied the involvement in the incident.

Republican insurgency in Afghanistan (2021–present)
 Air Force of the Islamic Emirate of Afghanistan – On 16 June 2022 a Taliban airforce Mil Mi-17 was shot down by the NRF in the Arezoo valley, two crew were killed and four captured.

Russian Invasion of Ukraine (2022–present)

2023 Chinese balloon incident 
On February 4, 2023, at 2:39 p.m. EST an F-22 Raptor, with Pilot Frank 01, fired an AIM-9X Sidewinder missile at a  military spy balloon belonging to China that had traversed North America over the previous several days. The balloon was brought down six nautical miles off the coast of Myrtle Beach, South Carolina.
US officials called the craft an "intelligence gathering" balloon, while Chinese authorities claimed it was a weather research device. (This is the first confirmed time since WWII that the United States has taken down a foreign military asset over US territory).

Civilian aircraft
List of airliner shootdown incidents – dealing with civilian airliners

1996 shootdown of Brothers to the Rescue aircraft – Two civilian Cessna Skymasters operated by the activist group Brothers to the Rescue were engaged by the Cuban air force and shot down north of Havana.

Colombian Civil War (1964–present)
Avianca Flight 203
2001 Peru shootdown – A Cessna 185 floatplane flown by a Christian missionary was shot down by a Cessna A-37 Dragonfly operated by the Peruvian Air Force after it was mistaken for a drug smuggling plane during patrols conducted under the Air Bridge Denial Program, in cooperation with the CIA.
13 May 2015 – A Hawker 800 carrying 1.2 metric tons of cocaine was intercepted by first the Venezuelan and then the Colombian air force. Venezuelan officials claimed to have shot down the jet, while Colombian officials claimed that it suffered an engine failure and crashed. The body of the aircraft's pilot was later recovered by the Colombian coast guard.
14 March 2016 – A police helicopter was, for some invastigations, shot down by ELN, killing all four police officers on board.

Corsican conflict (1976-present)
7 September 1976 - Seven militants of the FLNC set dynamite explosives aboard a Boeing 707 and caused an explosion at Ajaccio's airport, no injured were reported.

Militias–Comando Vermelho conflict (2006–present)
17 October 2009 – A police helicopter of the Rio De Janeiro police force was shot down by gang members of Amigos dos Amigos during a shootout with police and exploded on a football field, killing two police officers; another died later. The event was captured on video by a television cameraman who was embedded with the police on the ground.
19 November 2016 – In a similar incident, another Rio de Janeiro police helicopter was shot down by small-arms fire during a clash with gang members of Comando Vermelho and crashed in a ditch. All four police officers on board were killed.

Somali Civil War (1991–present)
4 May 2020 – An Embraer EMB 120 Brasilia was shot down in a friendly fire incident by Ethiopian force, the aircraft craft killing six on board.

Ukraine conflict (2014–present)

 Malaysia Airlines Flight 17
 Ukraine International Airlines Flight 752

See also
 List of Russian aircraft losses in the Second Chechen War
 List of aviation shootdowns and accidents during the Iraq War
 List of combat losses of United States military aircraft since the Vietnam War

Notes

Bibliography

 Polack, Peter. The Last Hot Battle of the Cold War: South Africa vs. Cuba in the Angolan. Casemate Publishers. 

Aircraft shootdown incidents
Shootdowns